Auchinleck Greyhound Stadium was a greyhound racing stadium in East Ayrshire.

History
The greyhound stadium in Auchinleck was located south of Mauchline Road and north of Barony Road in Auchinleck, East of Ayr. The track was a popular independent (unlicensed) track for over 70 years and had a 365-yard circumference and a 100 yards run to the first bend with the main distances being 264, 410 and 610 yards.  The major race was the Autumn Auchinleck Derby and the track was the birthplace of famous Scottish bookmaker Fearless Freddie Williams who had his first pitch there.

Closure
The stadium closed in 2003 and was sold for redevelopment in 2006.

References

Defunct greyhound racing venues in the United Kingdom
Greyhound racing in Scotland
Auchinleck
Sports venues in East Ayrshire